María Teresa García Pedroche is an American artist and curator, as well as the head of Family Experiences and Community engagement at the Dallas Museum of Art.

Early life
Born in Brownsville, Texas in 1959, María Teresa García Pedroche began cultivating her artistic talents from a young age. She earned her BFA in Communication Arts and Painting from Southwest State University (now Texas State University) in 1982. In 1988 she received her MFA in Painting and Ceramics from Texas Woman's University in Denton.

Professional career
From January 1990 to May 2000, María Teresa García Pedroche served as the Associate Curator and Education Director at the Meadows Museum in Dallas. Since then, she has served as Head of Family Experiences and Community Engagement at the Dallas Museum of Art.

Selected exhibitions and other works
María Teresa García Pedroche has had exhibitions throughout Texas, as well as in countries such as Mexico and Spain. One of her most well-known exhibits, Todo sobre mi madre (all about my mother) opened at the Bath House Cultural Center in Dallas 2010. This exhibit featured a collection of her multimedia collage prints that explored the relationship between herself and her mother, in addition to other family members. She was also featured in the Tejano Art Exhibition "Cultura y Vida" at the Art Center of Corpus Christi in 2012.

Central themes of artwork
María Teresa García Pedroche utilizes many mediums such as multimedia prints and painting to explore the intricacies of her familial relationships. In doing so she evokes a sense of nostalgia through the assemblage of antique collaged items. Furthermore, the superimposition of religious and spiritual iconography on family pictures provides the viewer with an insight into her family's religious beliefs. Her oil paintings explore themes of womanhood through the various representation forms of the female figure. While her multimedia media works demonstrate her finesse in techniques like double exposure, the angularity and shading in works such as Lágrimas tiene el camino demonstrate her mastery of painting as well.

References

Further reading
Anciso, Natalia. "CULTURA Y VIDA: A Tejano Art Exhibition." Www.NataliaAnciso.com. N.p., 15 Feb. 2012. Web. 9 Mar. 2017.
G. Pedroche, Maria Teresa. "Maria Teresa G. Pedroche." Maria Teresa G. Pedroche. LinkedIn, 9 Mar. 2017. Web. 9 Mar. 2017.
Garcia, Jesse. "Dallas' Arts Crusader." Informate DFW. Informate DFW Magazine, 11 July 2011. Web. 09 Mar. 2017.
GuideLive. "Todo Sobre Mi Madre: All About My Mother - Maria Teresa Garcia Pedroche @ Bath House Cultural Center in Dallas." GuideLive. GuideLive, 2009. Web. 09 Mar. 2017.
HernaÌndez-Avila, IneÌs, and Norma E. CantuÌ. Entre Guadalupe Y Malinche: Tejanas in Literature and Art. Austin: U of Texas, 2016. Print.

1959 births
Living people
Artists from Texas
American art curators
American women curators
People from Brownsville, Texas
Texas State University alumni
Texas Woman's University alumni
20th-century American women artists
21st-century American women artists
Hispanic and Latino American artists
Hispanic and Latino American women in the arts
American multimedia artists